This is a list of census areas of demographic notability in Canada. Data is from the Canada 2011 Census or Canada 2006 Census.

All census subdivisions 
Most populous municipality:
2011 and 2006: Toronto, Ontario, 2,615,060 and 2,503,281 respectively
Highest % increase in population
2006-2011: Fort Albany 67, Ontario (Part), 30,300.0%
2001-2006: Mystery Lake, Manitoba, 2840.0%
Largest census subdivision by land area:
2011 and 2006: Baffin, Unorganized, Nunavut, 988,309.38 km² and 1,038,839.2 km² respectively
Highest % of the population under 15 (2006): Lake of the Woods 37: 58.3%
Highest % of the population 15-64 (2006): Improvement District No. 9, Alberta: 95.2%
Lowest % of the population 15-64 (2006): Notre-Dame-des-Anges, Quebec: 4.5%
Highest % of the population 65+ (2006): Notre-Dame-des-Anges, Quebec: 94.3%
Highest % of the population 80+ (2006): Notre-Dame-des-Anges, Quebec: 72.7%
Highest median age (2006): Notre-Dame-des-Anges, Quebec: 85.0
Lowest median age (2006): Granville Lake, Manitoba: 10.8
Highest % Black (2006): North Preston, Nova Scotia (part of Halifax Regional Municipality): 80

Census subdivisions over 5,000 people 
Highest % increase in population:
2006-2011: Milton, Ontario, 56.5%
2001-2006: Chestermere, Alberta, 148.0%
Highest % decrease in population:
2011: Thunder Bay, Unorganized, Ontario, -10.3%
2006: Kitimat, British Columbia, -12.6%
Largest census subdivision by land area:
2011 and 2006: Kenora, Unorganized, Ontario, 400,771.81 km² and 400,652.34 km² respectively
Smallest municipality by land area:
2011 and 2006: Montreal West, Quebec, 1.41 km² in both censuses
Highest population density:
2011: Vancouver, British Columbia, 5,249.1/km²
2006: Westmount, Quebec, 5,092.6/km²
Lowest population density:
2011 and 2006: Kenora, Unorganized, Ontario, 0.018/km² in both censuses
Highest % of the population under 15: Mackenzie County, Alberta: 35.6
Lowest % of the population under 15: Capital G, British Columbia (Galiano, Saturna, Mayne, and North and South Pender Islands): 8.6
Highest % of the population 15-64: Whistler, British Columbia: 83.7
Lowest % of the population 15-64: Qualicum Beach, British Columbia: 50.5
Highest % of the population 65+: Qualicum Beach, British Columbia: 41.0
Lowest % of the population 65+: Regional Municipality of Wood Buffalo, Alberta: 1.8
Highest % of the population 80+: Sidney, British Columbia: 16.3
Lowest % of the population 80+: Iqaluit, Nunavut: 0.2
Highest median age: Qualicum Beach, British Columbia: 60.9
Lowest median age: Mackenzie County, Alberta: 22.8
Highest % of people whose mother tongue is English: Bay Roberts, Newfoundland and Labrador and Mount Pearl, Newfoundland and Labrador: 99
Lowest % of people whose mother tongue is English: Baie-Saint-Paul, Quebec: 0.1
Highest % of people whose mother tongue is French: Amqui, Quebec: 99.9
Lowest % of people whose mother tongue is French: Marystown, Newfoundland and Labrador, Bay Roberts, Newfoundland and Labrador and Stanley, Manitoba: 0
Highest % of people whose mother tongue is a Non-official language: Mackenzie County, Alberta: 68.1
Lowest % of people whose mother tongue is a Non-official language: Amqui, Quebec and Beauceville, Quebec: 0.2
Highest % Immigrant: Richmond, British Columbia: 57.4
Lowest % Immigrant: Amqui, Quebec and Beresford, New Brunswick: 0.2
Highest % of population with no high school degree: Mackenzie County, Alberta: 57
Lowest % of population with no high school degree: Westmount, Quebec: 1.3
Highest % with university degree: Greater Vancouver A, British Columbia: 80.2 (University Endowment Lands, Brunswick Beach and other east coast of Howe Sound communities, Indian River and other west coast of Indian Arm communities
Lowest % of population with university degree: Saint-Lin-Laurentides, Quebec: 3.1

Visible minorities and Aboriginal population 
Highest % European: Beaubassin East, New Brunswick: 99.8
Highest % visible minority: Markham, Ontario: 65.4
Highest % Aboriginal: Iqaluit, Nunavut: 60
Highest % Inuit: Iqaluit, Nunavut: 58.1
Highest % Chinese: Richmond, British Columbia: 53.6
Highest % Métis: Big Lakes County, Alberta: 35
Highest % South Asian: Brampton, Ontario: 31.7
Highest % First Nations: Prince Rupert, British Columbia: 31.5
Highest % Black: Ajax, Ontario: 13
Highest % Filipino: Winnipeg, Manitoba: 5.9
Highest % Latin American: Leamington, Ontario: 4.9
Highest % Southeast Asian: Mount Royal, Quebec: 3.1
Lowest % White: Richmond, British Columbia: 34.2
No visible minorities: Beaubassin East, New Brunswick; Saint-Calixte, Quebec; Chertsey, Quebec; Mont-Laurier, Quebec

Census metropolitan areas

Population and area 

 Most populous: Toronto, Ontario: 5,583,064
 Least populous: Peterborough, Ontario: 118,975
 Highest increase in population (%), 2006-2011 : Calgary, Alberta: 12.6%
 Highest decrease in population (%), 2006-2011 : Windsor, Ontario: -1.3%
 Largest land area (km2): Edmonton, Alberta: 9,426.73
 Smallest land area (km2): Guelph, Ontario: 593.52
 Highest population density (per km2) : Toronto, Ontario: 945.4
 Lowest population density (per km2) : Saint John, New Brunswick: 38.0

Age and sex 

 Highest proportion (%) of males: Calgary, Alberta: 49.95%
 Highest proportion (%) of females: Peterborough, Ontario: 52.11%
 Highest median age: Trois-Rivières, Quebec: 43.8
 Lowest median age: Calgary, Alberta: 35.7
 Highest increase in median age (years), 2001-2006 : Saguenay, Quebec: 3.7
 Lowest increase in median age (years), 2001-2006 : Calgary, Alberta: 0.8
 Highest percentage of children (0–14 years): Abbotsford-Mission, British Columbia: 19.0%
 Highest percentage of working-age population (15–64 years): Calgary, Alberta: 71.9%
 Highest percentage of seniors (65 years and over): Peterborough, Ontario: 19.5%
 Highest percentage of seniors, 80 years and over: Victoria, British Columbia: 6.2%

Education 

 Highest % of university degree at bachelor's level or above: Ottawa-Gatineau: 39.1%
 Lowest % of university degree at bachelor's level or above: Brantford, Ontario: 14.0%

Income 

 Highest median earnings: Ottawa-Gatineau: $50,298
 Lowest median earnings: Sherbrooke, Quebec: $35,348
 Highest increase in median earnings (%), 2000-2005: Edmonton, Alberta: 6.8%
 Highest decrease in median earnings (%), 2000-2005: Saguenay, Quebec: -8.5%
 Median 2005 earnings for full-year, full-time earners by education, both sexes, total - age group 25 to 64:
 Less than high school: Highest: Oshawa, Ontario: $42,474; Lowest: Trois-Rivières, Quebec: $24,955
 High school: Highest: Oshawa, Ontario: $45,796; Lowest: St. John's, Newfoundland: $30,447 	
 Trades or apprenticeship: Highest: Windsor, Ontario: $54,300; Lowest: Sherbrooke, Quebec: $32,245
 College: Highest: Oshawa, Ontario: $50,638; Lowest: Moncton, New Brunswick: $35,320
 University below bachelor: Highest: Oshawa, Ontario: $57,988; Lowest: Abbotsford, British Columbia: $42,701
 Bachelor: Highest: Ottawa-Gatineau: $65,079; Lowest: Abbotsford, British Columbia: $50,121
 Post-bachelor: Ottawa-Gatineau: $77,905; Lowest: Abbotsford, British Columbia: $61,698
 Median 2005 earnings of recent immigrants and Canadian-born earners, both sexes, aged 25 to 54, with or without university degree:
 Canadian-born, with university degree: Highest: Ottawa-Gatineau: $61,707; Lowest: Victoria, British Columbia: $44,895
 Canadian-born, without university degree: Highest: Oshawa, Ontario: $41,369; Lowest: Trois-Rivières, Quebec: $28,110 	
 Immigrant population, with university degree: Highest: Greater Sudbury, Ontario: $68,066; Lowest: Trois-Rivières, Quebec: $17,937
 Immigrant population, without university degree: Highest: Oshawa, Ontario: $38,452; Lowest: Trois-Rivières, Quebec: $19,496 	
 Recent immigrants, with university degree: Highest: St. John's, Newfoundland: $49,998; Lowest: Sherbrooke, Quebec: $17,562
 Recent immigrants, without university degree: Highest: Guelph, Ontario: $28,752; Lowest: Sherbrooke, Quebec: $14,616

Visible minorities and Aboriginal population

Highest population 
 Not-a-visible-minority: Montreal, Quebec: 2,998,145
 White Caucasians: Montreal, Quebec: 2,980,280
 Visible minorities: Toronto, Ontario: 2,174,065
 South Asians: Toronto, Ontario: 684,070
 Chinese: Toronto, Ontario: 486,330
 Blacks: Toronto, Ontario: 352,220 	
 Filipinos: Toronto, Ontario: 171,985
 Latin Americans: Toronto, Ontario: 99,290 	
 Arabs: Montreal, Quebec: 98,880
 West Asians: Toronto, Ontario: 75,475 	 	
 Southeast Asians: Toronto, Ontario: 70,215 	
 Aboriginals: Winnipeg, Manitoba: 68,385
 Koreans: Toronto, Ontario: 55,265
 Japanese: Vancouver, British Columbia: 25,425

Highest percentage 
 Not-a-visible-minority: Saguenay, Quebec: 99.1%
 White Caucasians: Trois-Rivières, Quebec: 97.5%
 Visible minorities: Toronto, Ontario: 42.9%
 Chinese: Vancouver, British Columbia: 18.2%
 South Asians: Abbotsford, British Columbia: 16.3%
 Aboriginals: Winnipeg, Manitoba: 10.0%
 Blacks: Toronto, Ontario: 6.9%
 Filipinos: Winnipeg, Manitoba: 5.4%
 Arabs: Windsor, Ontario: 3.1%
 Latin Americans: Montreal, Quebec: 2.1%
 Koreans: Vancouver, British Columbia: 2.1%
 Southeast Asians: Vancouver, British Columbia: 1.6%
 West Asians: Toronto, Ontario: 1.5%
 Japanese: Vancouver, British Columbia: 1.2%

Language 

 Highest population with English as mother tongue: Toronto, Ontario: 2,980,215
 Highest population with French as mother tongue: Montreal, Quebec: 2,395,530 	
 Highest population with a non-official language as mother tongue: Toronto, Ontario: 2,314,530
 Highest percentage with French as mother tongue: Saguenay, Quebec: 98.3%	
 Highest percentage with English as mother tongue: St. John's, Newfoundland: 96.9%
 Highest percentage with a non-official language as mother tongue: Toronto, Ontario: 41.8%
 Lowest population with English as mother tongue: Saguenay, Quebec: 1,230	
 Lowest population with a non-official language as mother tongue: Saguenay, Quebec: 1,005 		
 Lowest population with French as mother tongue: St. John's, Newfoundland: 810
 Lowest percentage with English as mother tongue: Saguenay, Quebec: 0.8%	
 Lowest percentage with a non-official language as mother tongue: Saguenay, Quebec: 0.6% 		
 Lowest percentage with French as mother tongue: St. John's, Newfoundland: 0.4%

Immigration and citizenship 

 Highest proportion (%) of Canadian citizens: Saguenay, Quebec: 99.4%
 Lowest proportion (%) of Canadian citizens: Toronto, Ontario: 87.3%
 Highest proportion (%) of immigrant population: Toronto, Ontario: 45.7%	
 Highest proportion (%) of non-immigrant population: Saguenay, Quebec: 98.7%
 Highest proportion (%) that immigrated before 1991: Toronto, Ontario: 22.7%		
 Highest proportion (%) that immigrated between 1991 and 1995: Toronto, Ontario: 7.1%		
 Highest proportion (%) that immigrated before 1996 and 2000: Toronto, Ontario: 7.1%		
 Highest proportion (%) that immigrated before 2001 and 2006: Toronto, Ontario: 8.8%
 Lowest proportion (%) that immigrated before 1991: Saguenay, Quebec: 0.4%		
 Lowest proportion (%) that immigrated between 1991 and 1995: Saguenay, Quebec: 0.1%		
 Lowest proportion (%) that immigrated before 1996 and 2000: Moncton, New Brunswick: 0.2%		
 Lowest proportion (%) that immigrated before 2001 and 2006: Greater Sudbury, Ontario: 0.4%
 Highest % of India as place of birth of immigrants: Abbotsford, British Columbia: 40.9%
 Highest % of United Kingdom as place of birth of immigrants: Peterborough, Ontario: 35.1%
 Highest % of United States as place of birth of immigrants: Moncton, New Brunswick: 29.4%
 Highest % of Italy as place of birth of immigrants: Greater Sudbury, Ontario: 21.5%
 Highest % of Philippines as place of birth of immigrants: Winnipeg, Manitoba: 20.6%
 Highest % of France as place of birth of immigrants: Quebec City, Quebec: 19.1%
 Highest % of China as place of birth of immigrants: Vancouver, British Columbia: 16.5%
 Highest % of Colombia as place of birth of immigrants: Saguenay, Quebec: 11.4%
 Highest % of Finland as place of birth of immigrants: Thunder Bay, Ontario: 10.6%

Ethnic origin (single responses)

Highest population 
 Multiple ethnic origin: Toronto, Ontario: 1,626,670
 Canadians: Montreal, Quebec: 1,119,010 	
 Chinese: Toronto, Ontario: 462,455
 East Indians: Toronto, Ontario: 390,325
 French: Montreal, Quebec: 362,445 	
 Italians: Toronto, Ontario: 312,925 	
 English: Toronto, Ontario: 177,495
 Filipinos: Toronto, Ontario: 136,495 	
 Portuguese: Toronto, Ontario: 130,865
 Jamaicans: Toronto, Ontario: 103,650

Highest percentage 

 Multiple ethnic origin: Thunder Bay, Ontario: 59.2%
 Canadians: Saguenay, Quebec: 59.1%	
 English: St. John's, Newfoundland: 18.4%
 Chinese: Vancouver, British Columbia: 17.0%
 French: Quebec City, Quebec: 15.8%
 East Indians: Abbotsford, British Columbia: 13.9%   	
 Irish: St. John's, Newfoundland: 10.1%	
 Germans: Regina, Saskatchewan: 7.8%
 Italians: St.Catharines-Niagara: 6.4%	
 Filipinos: Winnipeg, Manitoba: 4.7% 	
 Scottish: Halifax, Nova Scotia: 4.6%
 Ukrainians: Saskatoon, Saskatchewan: 4.5%
 Dutch (Netherlands): Abbotsford, British Columbia: 4.0% 	
 North American Indians: Regina, Saskatchewan: 3.5%
 Finnish: Thunder Bay, Ontario: 3.2%
 Portuguese: Kitchener-Cambridge-Waterloo, Ontario: 3.1%

Federal electoral districts (2003 redistribution)

Population and area 
 Most populous: Oak Ridges—Markham (Ontario): 228,997
 Least populous: Labrador (Newfoundland and Labrador): 26,728
 Highest increase in population (%), 2006-2011 : Oak Ridges—Markham (Ontario): 35.0%
 Highest decrease in population (%), 2006-2011 : Kenora (Ontario): -12.9% (Note: many First Nations communities in this riding were not enumerated in 2011 due to forest fires)
 Largest land area (km2): Nunavut (Nunavut): 1,877,787.62
 Smallest land area (km2): Papineau (Quebec): 8.93
 Highest population density (per km2) : Papineau (Quebec): 11,247.1
 Lowest population density (per km2) : Nunavut (Nunavut): < 0.05

Age and sex 
 Highest median age: Nanaimo-Alberni (British Columbia): 50.1
 Lowest median age: Nunavut (Nunavut): 24.1

Education 
(highest %)

 Earned doctorate: Vancouver Quadra, British Columbia: 3.9%
 Master's degree: Ottawa Centre, Ontario: 12.7%
 Degree in medicine, dentistry, veterinary medicine or optometry: Vancouver Quadra, British Columbia: 2.7%
 University certificate or diploma above bachelor level: Thornhill, Ontario: 5.0%
 Bachelor's degree: Vancouver Quadra, British Columbia: 27.4%
 University certificate or degree: Vancouver Quadra, British Columbia: 55.7%

Ethnic origin 
(highest % - multiple responses)

 Inuit: Nunavut, Nunavut: 85.4%
 Canadian: Beauce, Quebec: 83.5%
 First Nations (North American Indian): Churchill, Manitoba: 67.9%
 Chinese: Richmond, British Columbia: 55.9%
 English: Bonavista—Gander—Grand Falls—Windsor, Newfoundland and Labrador: 47.2%
 Scottish: Cardigan, Prince Edward Island:  47.0%
 French: Nickel Belt, Ontario: 46.0%
 Italian: Vaughan, Ontario: 45.2%
 German: Medicine Hat, Alberta: 37.5%
 East Indian: Bramalea-Gore-Malton, Ontario: 35.5%
 Irish: Cardigan, Prince Edward Island: 34.1%
 Ukrainian: Yorkton-Melville, Saskatchewan: 29.3%
 Filipino: Winnipeg North, Manitoba: 29.2%
 Portuguese: Davenport, Ontario: 26.4%
 Jewish: Thornhill, Ontario: 24.2%
 Haitian: Bourassa, Quebec: 17.5%
 Polish: Kildonan-St. Paul, Manitoba: 13.1%
 Finnish: Thunder Bay-Superior North, Ontario: 13.1%
 Greek: Laval-Les Îles, Quebec: 12.4%
 Russian: Thornhill, Ontario: 12.2%
 Sri Lankan: Scarborough-Rouge River, Ontario: 11.9%
 Dutch (Netherlands): Abbotsford, British Columbia: 11.2%
 Iranian: Richmond Hill, Ontario: 10.0%

Immigration 
(highest %)

 Non-immigrants:                            Roberval—Lac-Saint-Jean (Quebec): 99.4%
 Immigrants:                                Scarborough—Agincourt (Ontario):  67.8%
 Asia and the Middle East:                  Scarborough—Agincourt (Ontario):  53.0%
 Eastern Asia:                              Richmond (British Columbia): 40.5%
 Europe:                                    Davenport (Ontario): 28.5%
 Southern Asia:                             Bramalea—Gore—Malton (Ontario): 25.1%
 Southern Europe:                           Davenport (Ontario): 25.0%
 China, People's Republic of:               Scarborough—Agincourt (Ontario):  24.7%
 India:                                     Newton—North Delta (British Columbia): 22.0%
 Southern Europe, other than Italy:         Davenport (Ontario): 19.2%
 Italy:                                     Vaughan (Ontario): 17.1%
 Southeast Asia:                            Winnipeg North (Manitoba): 15.2%
 Eastern Europe:                            York Centre (Ontario): 15.1%
 Hong Kong, Special Administrative Region:  Richmond (British Columbia): 14.6%
 Philippines:                               Winnipeg North (Manitoba): 13.5%
 Southern Asia, other than India:           Scarborough—Rouge River (Ontario): 12.8%
 West Central Asia and the Middle East:     Saint-Laurent—Cartierville (Quebec): 11.6%
 Africa:                                    Saint-Laurent—Cartierville (Quebec): 11.3%

Language

Mother tongue 
(highest %)

 English: Avalon (Newfoundland and Labrador): 99.3%
 French: Montmagny—L'Islet—Kamouraska—Rivière-du-Loup (Quebec): 99.0%
 Inuktitut: Nunavut (Nunavut): 66.8%
 Panjabi (Punjabi): Newton—North Delta (British Columbia): 33.4%
 German: Portage—Lisgar (Manitoba): 23.6%
 Cree, not otherwise specified: Churchill (Manitoba): 21.6%
 Portuguese: Davenport (Ontario): 20.7%
 Italian: Vaughan (Ontario): 19.2%
 Cantonese: Richmond (British Columbia): 17.8%
 Tagalog (Pilipino, Filipino): Winnipeg North (Manitoba): 16.8%
 Chinese, not otherwise specified: Richmond (British Columbia): 15.6%
 Arabic: Saint-Laurent—Cartierville (Quebec): 14.0%
 Mandarin: Richmond (British Columbia): 13.4%
 Tamil: Scarborough-Rouge River (Ontario): 13.2%
 Russian: York Centre (Ontario): 11.4%
 Dene: Desnethé-Missinippi-Churchill River (Saskatchewan): 10.5%

Language Groups 

 Aboriginal languages: Nunavut (Nunavut): 68.0%
 Chinese: Richmond (British Columbia): 48.4%
 Indo-Aryan languages: Newton—North Delta (British Columbia): 40.0%
 Romance languages (other than French):  Davenport (Ontario): 32.0%
 Germanic languages (other than English): Portage—Lisgar (Manitoba): 24.3%
 Malayo-Polynesian languages: Winnipeg North (Manitoba): 16.8%
 Slavic languages: Etobicoke—Lakeshore (Ontario): 15.0%
 Semitic languages: Saint-Laurent—Cartierville (Quebec): 14.5%
 Dravidian languages: Scarborough-Rouge River (Ontario): 13.5%

Home language 
(highest %)

 English: Avalon (Newfoundland and Labrador): 99.6%
 French: Roberval—Lac-Saint-Jean (Quebec): 99.4%
 Inuktitut: Nunavut (Nunavut): 51.9%
 Panjabi (Punjabi): Newton—North Delta (British Columbia): 26.8%
 Cree, not otherwise specified: Abitibi-Baie-James-Nunavik-Eeyou (Quebec): 16.6%
 Cantonese: Richmond (British Columbia): 15.8%
 Portuguese: Davenport (Ontario): 14.0%
 German: Portage—Lisgar (Manitoba): 12.0%
 Chinese, not otherwise specified: Scarborough-Agincourt (Ontario): 12.0%
 Mandarin: Richmond (British Columbia): 11.8%
 Tamil: Scarborough-Rouge River (Ontario): 10.5%

Language groups 

 Aboriginal languages: Nunavut (Nunavut): 53.0%
 Chinese: Richmond (British Columbia): 39.7%
 Indo-Aryan languages: Newton—North Delta (British Columbia): 30.9%
 Romance languages (other than French):  Davenport (Ontario): 21.2%
 Germanic languages  (other than English): Portage—Lisgar (Manitoba): 12.2%
 Slavic languages: York Centre (Ontario): 10.9%
 Dravidian languages: Scarborough-Rouge River (Ontario): 10.7%

Religion 
(highest %)

 Christian: Avalon (Newfoundland and Labrador):              99.0%
 Catholic:                 Rivière-du-Loup-Montmagny (Quebec):   97.1%
 Protestant:               Bonavista—Exploits (Newfoundland and Labrador):          81.0%
 Not a Christian: Vancouver Kingsway (British Columbia):              62.8% (No religious affiliation: 43.5%, Buddhist: 9.9%, Sikh: 3.2%)
 Non-Christian religious affiliation: Mount Royal (Quebec):              49.8% (Jewish: 36.3%, Muslim: 5.6%, Hindu: 4.5%, Buddhist: 3.0%)
 No religious affiliation: Vancouver East (British Columbia):              47.4%
 Non-Judeo-Christian religious affiliation:                     Newton—North Delta (British Columbia):          38.0% (Sikh: 27.6%, Muslim: 4.3%, Hindu: 4.1%)
 Jewish:                   Thornhill (Ontario):                   36.6%
 Sikh:                     Newton—North Delta (British Columbia):          27.6%
 Christian Orthodox:       Laval—Les Îles (Quebec):              15.9%
 Muslim:                   Don Valley West (Ontario):             13.6%
 Hindu:                    Scarborough—Rouge River (Ontario):     13.6%
 Buddhist:                 Vancouver Kingsway (British Columbia):           9.9%
 Christian, not included elsewhere: Abbotsford (British Columbia):          9.8%

Visible minorities and Aboriginal population 
(highest %)
 Not an Aboriginal: Markham-Unionville (Ontario): 99.91%
 Not a visible minority: Haute-Gaspésie-La Mitis-Matane-Matapédia (Quebec): 99.7%
 White Caucasian: Beauce (Quebec): 99.3%
 Not a White Caucasian: Scarborough—Rouge River (Ontario): 89.9%
 Visible minority: Scarborough—Rouge River (Ontario): 89.7%
 Aboriginal: Nunavut (Nunavut): 85.0%
 Inuit: Nunavut (Nunavut): 84.0%
 North American Indian: Churchill (Manitoba): 61.1%
 Chinese: Richmond (British Columbia): 50.2%
 South Asian: Newton—North Delta (British Columbia): 42.7%
 Filipino: Winnipeg North (Manitoba): 20.2%
 Black: York South-Weston (Ontario): 19.6%
 Métis: Desnethé-Missinippi-Churchill River (Saskatchewan): 16.4%
 Arab: Saint-Laurent-Cartierville (Quebec): 11.1%
 Latin American: York South-Weston (Ontario): 8.3%
 Korean: Willowdale (Ontario): 7.8%
 West Asian: Richmond Hill (Ontario): 7.2%
 Southeast Asian: York West (Ontario): 7.1%
 Japanese: Vancouver Centre (British Columbia): 3.4%

Aboriginals (census subdivisions with 250+ population) 
Highest % Metis: Green Lake, Saskatchewan: 83.3
Highest % Inuit: Akulivik, Quebec: 98
Indian reserve with lowest Aboriginal %:  Duck Lake 7, British Columbia: 3.6

References

External links 
Canada Year Book (2010) - Statistics Canada
Population estimates and projections, 2010 - 2036 -  Statistics Canada

Demographics of Canada